Thiruvangad Sree Ramaswami Temple is a temple located in the eastern part of Thalassery. The temple is generally known as the Brass Pagoda from the copper sheeting of its roof. A part of the temple was damaged by Tipu Sultan's troops in the 18th century, but the temple is believed to have been saved from destruction. It was one of the outposts of the Thalassery fort in the 18th century. Conferences between the officials of the East India Company and local leaders in its precincts, at which political treaties and agreements were signed. The annual festival of the temple commences on Vishu day in Medam and lasts for seven days.

The temple is one of the five major shrines dedicated to Sree Rama in Kerala. The other four are at Thrinayamkudam (Vaikom), Triprayar, Thiruvilluamala and Kadalur. It is located on an elevated plot of 2.75 hectares with an adjoining temple tank known as Chira, which extends over a hectare.

Main festivals
Chakyar Koothu is performed in the temple as a part of rituals. Mani Chakyar family traditionally hold the right to perform on temple grounds.

Gallery

See also
Hinduism
Kannur
Thalassery
Kerala
Chakyar Koothu
Mani Madhava Chakyar
Mani Damodara Chakyar
Temples of Kerala

References

External links

 Temple Website
 Places of Tourist Interest in Kannur 

 Thiruvangad temple attractions and its tour delights

Buildings and structures in Thalassery
Hindu temples in Kannur district